Amurensin is a flavonol, a type of flavonoid. It is the tert-amyl alcohol derivative of kaempferol 7-O-glucoside. It can be found in Phellodendron amurense.

Related compounds 
6"'-O-acetyl amurensin is found in the leaves of Phellodendron japonicum.

References 

Flavonol glucosides
Tertiary alcohols
Phenols
3-Hydroxypropenals
Resorcinol ethers